Jo Ann Sprague (born November 3, 1931) is a former Massachusetts State Representative (1993–1998) and State Senator (1999–2004) from Walpole. In the Massachusetts Senate she represented the Norfolk, Bristol, and Plymouth district, but moved in 2003 to the Bristol and Norfolk district. Previously she was a State Representative from the 9th Norfolk district. She is a member of the Republican Party.

Biography
Sprague was born in Nashville, Tennessee. She graduated from the University of Massachusetts Boston in 1980 with a B.A. in classical studies. She served as a selectman in Walpole, Massachusetts from 1977 to 1980, a member of the Walpole Capital Budget committee from 1980 to 1992, a member of the Walpole Republican Town Committee. She was elected to the Massachusetts House of Representatives and served from 1993 to 1998, then served in the Massachusetts Senate from 1999 to 2004. She ran for the United States House of Representatives in 2001 to represent , but lost to Democratic opponent Stephen Lynch.

References

External links

|-

|-

Republican Party Massachusetts state senators
Republican Party members of the Massachusetts House of Representatives
People from Walpole, Massachusetts
Politicians from Nashville, Tennessee
Living people
Women state legislators in Massachusetts
1931 births
21st-century American women